Peter Augustus Brandt (2 July 1931 – 28 April 2022) was a British rower. He competed in the men's double sculls event at the 1952 Summer Olympics. His rowing partner was John MacMillan and they were eliminated in the first repechage.

Brandt died on 28 April 2022, at the age of 90.

References

External links
 

1931 births
2022 deaths
British male rowers
Olympic rowers of Great Britain
Rowers at the 1952 Summer Olympics
Rowers from Greater London